"Catch 22" is a song by Australian rapper Illy featuring English singer Anne-Marie. The song was released on 10 October 2016, alongside the announcement of his forthcoming fifth studio album, Two Degrees.

Anne-Marie spoke to Matt and Alex on Triple J, saying: "I listened to some of his music and I really like that he kept through an Australian accent through rapping… I like him thought it would be a good idea." 

The Mark Alston directed music video was nominated for Best Video at the ARIA Music Awards of 2017.

At the APRA Music Awards of 2018 the song won Urban Work of the Year.

Music video
The "Catch 22" video was released on 6 November 2016. It is set in a previously dead video game arcade where a group of friends find a game called Catch 22, allowing them to test their fate.

Track listing

Commercial performance
"Catch 22" debuted at number eighteen on the Australian ARIA singles chart.

Charts

Weekly charts

Year-end charts

Certifications

References 

2016 singles
2016 songs
Illy (rapper) songs
Anne-Marie (singer) songs
APRA Award winners
Songs written by M-Phazes
Songs written by Anne-Marie (singer)